Pawan Hans Limited  is a central public sector undertaking based at Noida in Delhi NCR, India. It is under the ownership of Ministry of Civil Aviation, Government of India. It has cumulatively flown more than 1 million hours and has had 2.5 million landings on its fleet since its formation. The headquarter is located at Sector-1 in Noida with regional office at Delhi and the operations are based at the Juhu Aerodrome in Vile Parle (West), Mumbai.

Other than providing helicopter services to Oil and Natural Gas Corporation (ONGC) to its off-shore locations, this government-owned-helicopter service provider is often engaged in providing services to various state governments in India, particularly in North-east India, Inter-island ferry services in Andaman and Nicobar Islands, and for the last 26 years service to Lakshadweep Administration in ferrying people from Islands to Cochin International Airport and inter-island services. These are considered as the backbone of Lakshadweep and Minicoy Islands which are far-flung from Indian shores extending up to 400–500 km into the Arabian Sea, Vaishno Devi Helicopter service for devotees. Service to BSF and Maharashtra Police for Medical and Logistics support in event of Maoist attack on troops.

History
Pawan Hans Limited was incorporated on 15 October 1985 as the Helicopter Corporation of India (HCI), the country's one and only government-owned-helicopter service provider with the objective of providing helicopter support services to the oil sector for its off-shore exploration operations, services in remote areas and charter services for promotion of tourism. It is a government-owned-helicopter service provider with 78.5% ownership by the union government & 21.5% with ONGC. ONGC has upped its stake to 49% recently, a move that will see the equity base of PHL being enhanced to 245 crores from the existing 113 crores.

As of January 2017, the partially government owned helicopter service provider had a net worth of 3,701.5 crores and paid-up equity share capital was 245.61 crores. Pawan Hans is an "Approved Maintenance Centre of Eurocopter" and also the first ISO 9001: 2000 certified aviation company in India. On 12 January 2017, the Government of India approved the privatization of Pawan Hans.

Services
Pawan Hans offers helicopter services for:

 Off-Shore operations
 Inter-island transportation
 Connecting inaccessible areas
 Heli-Pilgrimage Tourism
 Training & Skill Development
 Customs and pipeline surveillance
 Casualty and rescue work
 Charter services
 Joy Rides
 VIP transportation
 Film shooting and aerial photography
 Flower dropping and other
 Customised services.
 Heliport Services
 MRO Services
 HEMS

Destinations
Pawan Hans flies to various points in the states of Arunachal Pradesh, Chandigarh (U.T.) Tripura, Sikkim, Nagaland, Odisha, West Bengal, and also to MHA Guwahati in Assam. While Meghalaya state is suspended, it resumed its service on 26 July 2012. Mukul Sangma, the chief minister of Meghalaya, took a personal ride in the helicopter to check if it is resumable or not.

Arunachal Pradesh
 Itanagar (Helicopter)
 Naharlagun (Helicopter)
 Tawang Town (Helicopter)

Assam
 Guwahati – Lokpriya Gopinath Bordoloi International Airport

Chandigarh
 Chandigarh Airport (Helicopter)

Jammu and Kashmir
 Katra (Helicopter)
 Vaishno Devi Temple (Helicopter)

Maharashtra
 Mumbai – Juhu Aerodrome (HUB) (Offshore operation)

Mizoram
 Aizawl – Lunglei
 Aizawl – Kolasib
 Aizawl – Serchhip
 Aizawl – Champhai
 Aizawl – Khawzawl
 Aizawl – Lawngtlai
 Aizawl – Saiha
 Aizawl – Chawngte
 Aizawl – Mamit

Meghalaya
 Shillong – Shillong Airport
 Tura (Helicopter)

Odisha
 Bhubaneswar – Biju Patnaik International Airport
 Paradip (Helicopter)
 Jharsuguda
 Brahmapur

Himachal Pradesh
 Shimla Airport (Helicopter)

West Bengal
 Kolkata – Cooch Behar
 Durgapur – Asansol
 Durgapur – Haldia
 Siliguri – Darjeeling
 Kolkata – Siliguri
 Kolkata – Durgapur
 including Malda
Uttrakhand

 Dehradun – Phata- Shri Kedarnath – Phata – Dehradun (Sessional Charter Services)
 Phata- Shri Kedarnath – Phata (Sessional Passenger Services)
 Char Dham Yatra (Shri Kedarnath, Shri BadriNath, Gangotri and Yamnotri)
 Dehradun - New Tehri - Srinagar- Gauchar and vice versa

Fleet
The Pawan Hans fleet as of April 2019 includes:

It also operates & maintains HAL Dhruv helicopters belonging to Hindustan Aeronautics

Rent
 Pawan Hans also rent a helicopter to Regatta Group.

Jal Hans

Pawan Hans jointly owns Jal Hans, India's first amphibious aircraft service with the Andaman and Nicobar Islands Administration.

Accidents and incidents
On 13 January 2018, a helicopter with ONGC staff on board crashes in Mumbai, all bodies includes 5 ONGC officers and 2 pilots recovered.
In 2011, PHHLs operations in the North Eastern States of India came under serious public criticism due to safety issues. After the crash that killed the Chief Minister of Arunachal Pradesh Dorjee Khandu and five others, it operations in the North East region were suspended and DGCA was asked to conduct safety audit of the company. The operations were resumed in January 2013. But yet another accident took place on 4 August 2015 killing 3 people on board, including an IAS officer.

 22 Sep 2004: Meghalaya Community and Rural Development Minister Cyprian Sangma, two MLAs and a former Deputy Speaker were killed when a Pawan Hans helicopter A 365N crashed near Shillong.
 06 Aug 2010: a Pawan Hans crew member fell  to his death at Namsai in Arunachal Pradesh, while trying to close a door of that had flung open during a flight.
 16 Dec 2010: a Pawan Hans Dauphin 365 N3 helicopter crashed at Chandigarh Airport, leaving the pilots injured.
 19 Apr 2011: a Pawan Hans Mil Mi-17 on a flight from Guwahati to Tawang, crashed in a gorge and caught fire while trying to land near Tawang. Out of 23 people on board, 17 were killed.
 29 Apr 2011: a Pawan Hans AS350 B-3 helicopter carrying Dorjee Khandu, the Chief Minister of Arunachal Pradesh, and four other people, went missing. It was traced four days later near Lobthang. All 5 people were found dead.
 04 Aug 2015: a Pawan Hans Dauphin N3 twin-engined aircraft carrying Tirap Deputy Commissioner Kamlesh Kumar Joshi, a 2010 batch IAS officer, and pilots M S Brar and Rajeev Hoskote crashed killing all its occupants.
 04 Nov 2015: Pawan Hans Helicopter (Aerospatiale Dauphin) employed in offshore oil platform service crashed into the Arabian Sea off the coast of Mumbai. The Helicopter was on night flying practice when the incident happened and was occupied by two pilots only, no passengers were present. Both the pilots perished in the incident.
 13 Jan 2018: Pawan Hans Helicopter crashed into the Arabian Sea Off the coast of Mumbai while ferrying seven people including ONGC personnel. The bodies of the seven people, including five senior ONGC officers, debris from the aircraft was located.
 28 June 2022 Pawan Hans Sikorsky helicopter crashed into the Arabian Sea killing four people, including three ONGC personnel. Five others were rescued.

See also
 Rohini Heliport (Delhi) india

References

External links

 
 Pawan Hans fleet

Aviation in India
Companies based in New Delhi
Airlines established in 1985
Government-owned companies of India
Helicopter airlines
Helicopter operators
Ministry of Civil Aviation (India)
1985 establishments in Uttar Pradesh
Oil and Natural Gas Corporation